Naval Ravikant is an Indian-American entrepreneur and investor. He is the co-founder, chairman and former CEO of AngelList. He has invested early-stage in over 200 companies including Uber, FourSquare, Twitter, Wish.com, Poshmark, Postmates, Thumbtack, Notion, SnapLogic, Opendoor, Clubhouse, Stack Overflow, Bolt, OpenDNS, Yammer, and Clearview AI, with over 70 total exits and more than 10 Unicorn companies.

Ravikant is a Fellow of the Edmund Hillary Fellowship. As a podcaster he shares advice on pursuing health, wealth, and happiness.

Early life and education
Ravikant was born in New Delhi, India in 1974. He moved to New York with his mother and his brother, Kamal, when he was 9. He graduated from Stuyvesant High School in 1991. In 1995, he graduated with degrees in Computer Science and Economics from Dartmouth College. In college, he interned at law firm Davis Polk & Wardwell.
After graduating from Dartmouth College, Naval had a brief stint at Boston Consulting Group before heading to Silicon Valley.

Career

Epinions

In 1999, Ravikant co-founded consumer product review site Epinions. They raised $45 million in venture capital from Benchmark Capital and August Capital. In 2003, Epinions merged with comparison pricing site Dealtime with the approval of Ravikant and the other co-founders that had left the company—even though it meant valuing their shares at zero.

The merged company became Shopping.com which held an IPO in October 2004. After its first day of trading, it was worth $750 million. In January 2005, Ravikant and three of his co-founders filed a lawsuit against Benchmark, August Capital, their co-founder Nirav Tolia who remained at Epinions after his co-founders' departures claiming that—to get their approval for the merger—they were misled to believe that at the time of the merger, the company was worth "$23 million to $38 million", less than the $45 million that they had raised in outside capital, making their shares worthless. The lawsuit was settled in December 2005.

Hit Forge
Around 2007, Ravikant started a $20 million early stage venture capital fund named "The Hit Forge". Hit Forge invested in prominent startups including Twitter, Uber and Stack Overflow.

AngelList

In 2007, Ravikant began co-writing a blog called Venture Hacks, which "offered detailed advice on negotiating term sheets, explained which sections mattered, and which provisions were bogus." That blog evolved into AngelList, which Ravikant co-founded in 2010, as a fundraising platform for startups to raise money from angel investors. AngelList also operates Product Hunt. In 2022, AngelList reached a $4 billion valuation. Naval is the co-founder, chairman and former CEO of AngelList.

MetaStable Capital
In 2014, Ravikant co-founded MetaStable Capital, a cryptocurrency hedge fund that owned Bitcoin, Ethereum, Monero and a number of other cryptocurrencies. A June 2017 regulatory filing reported its assets as $69 million. Investors in the fund include Andreessen Horowitz, Sequoia Capital, Union Square Ventures, Founders Fund and Bessemer Venture Partners.

Spearhead.co investment fund

In 2017, Naval launched Spearhead, an investment fund which raised $100m for its third fund to provide founders with $1m each to invest in technology companies as angel investors. The first two classes of Spearhead include founders from 35 companies. Together, these companies are worth over $10B, and four of them are unicorns. The companies include Neuralink, Opendoor, PillPack, Shippo (company), Rippling and Scale. Previous Spearhead leads include Shippo co-founder and chief executive officer Laura Behrens Wu, Scale AI founder and CEO Alexandr Wang and Rippling co-founder and chief technology officer Prasanna Sankar.

Nav.al, Spearhead, and other podcasts
Naval runs a short-form podcast at Nav.al and Spearhead.co, where he discusses philosophy, business, and investing. He has also been a podcast guest on The Joe Rogan Experience, The Tim Ferriss Show, Coffee with Scott Adams, The James Altucher Show and Farnam Street, among others.

With Ravikant's permission, Eric Jorgenson curated Naval's tweets, essays, and interviews on wealth and happiness, then published them as a free downloadable book called The Almanack of Naval Ravikant, with a foreword by Tim Ferriss.

Ravikant has a chapter giving advice in Tim Ferriss' book Tools of Titans.

See also 

 Marc Andreessen
 Ben Horowitz
 Chamath Palihapitiya
 Balaji Srinivasan

References

External links 
 Naval Ravikant on Twitter
 Personal blog

Living people
Stuyvesant High School alumni
Dartmouth College alumni
American chief executives
1974 births
Angel investors
American businesspeople
American podcasters